The Chickasaw are an indigenous people of the Southeastern Woodlands. Their traditional territory was in the Southeastern United States of Mississippi, Alabama, and Tennessee as well in southwestern Kentucky. Their language is classified as a member of the Muskogean language family. In the present day, they are organized as the federally recognized Chickasaw Nation.

Chickasaw people have a migration story in which they moved from a land west of the Mississippi River to reach present-day northeast Mississippi, northwest Alabama, and into Lawrence County, Tennessee.  They had interaction with French, English, and Spanish colonists during the colonial period. The United States considered the Chickasaw one of the Five Civilized Tribes of the Southeast, as they adopted numerous practices of European Americans. Resisting European-American settlers encroaching on their territory, they were forced by the U.S. government to sell their traditional lands in the 1832 Treaty of Pontotoc Creek and move to Indian Territory (Oklahoma) during the era of Indian removal in the 1830s.

Most of their descendants remain as residents of what is now Oklahoma. The Chickasaw Nation in Oklahoma is the 13th-largest federally recognized tribe in the United States. Its members are related to the Choctaw and share a common history with them. The Chickasaw were divided into two groups (moieties): the Imosak Cha'a' (chopped hickory) and the Inchokka' Lhipa''' (worn out house), though the characteristics of these groups in relation to Chickasaw villages, clans, and house groups is uncertain. They traditionally followed a kinship system of matrilineal descent, in which inheritance and descent are traced through the maternal line. Children are considered born into the mother's family and clan, and gain their social status from her. Women controlled most property and hereditary leadership in the tribe passed through the maternal line.

Etymology
The name Chickasaw, as noted by anthropologist John Swanton, belonged to a Chickasaw minko', or leader. "Chickasaw" is the English spelling of Chikashsha, meaning "comes from Chicsa". In an 1890 extra census bulletin on the Cherokee, Chickasaw, Choctaw, Muskogee, and Seminole, a history of the Choctaw and Chickasaw was included that was written by R.W. McAdam. McAdam claimed that the word "Chikasha" meant "rebel" in the Choctaw language. Spanish explorer Hernando de Soto had recorded the people as Chicaza when his expedition came into contact with them in 1540; the Spanish were the first known Europeans to explore the North American Southeast.HALE, Duane K & GIBSON, Arrell M. (1989) The Chickasaw, Frank W. Porter III General Editor, Chelsea House, New York.

History

The origin of the Chickasaw is uncertain; 20th-century scholars, such as the archaeologist Patricia Galloway, theorize that the Chickasaw and Choctaw split into distinct peoples in the 17th century from the remains of Plaquemine culture and other groups whose ancestors had lived in the lower Mississippi Valley for thousands of years. When Europeans first encountered them, the Chickasaw were living in villages in what is now northeastern Mississippi.

The Chickasaw are believed to have migrated into Mississippi from the west, as their oral history attests. They and the Choctaw were once one people and migrated from west of the Mississippi River into present-day Mississippi in prehistoric times; the Chickasaw and Choctaw split along the way. The Mississippian Ideological Interaction Sphere spanned the Eastern Woodlands. The Mississippian cultures emerged from previous moundbuilding societies by 880 CE. They built complex, dense villages supporting a stratified society, with centers throughout the Mississippi and Ohio River Valleys and their tributaries.

In the 15th century, proto-Chickasaw people left the Tombigbee Valley after the collapse of the Moundville chiefdom. They settled into the upper Yazoo and Pearl River valleys in present-day Mississippi. Historian Arrell Gibson and anthropologist John R. Swanton believed the Chickasaw Old Fields were in Madison County, Alabama.

Another version of the Chickasaw creation story is that they arose at Nanih Waiya, a great earthwork mound built about 300 CE by Woodland peoples. It is also sacred to the Choctaw, who have a similar story about it. The mound was built about 1400 years before the coalescence of each of these peoples as ethnic groups.

The first European contact with the Chickasaw ancestors was in 1540 when Spanish explorer Hernando de Soto encountered them and stayed in one of their towns, most likely near present-day Tupelo, Mississippi. After various disagreements, the Chickasaw attacked the De Soto expedition in a nighttime raid, nearly destroying the force. The Spanish moved on quickly.

The Chickasaw began to establish trading relationships with English colonists in the Province of Carolina after that colony was established in 1670. After acquiring firearms from colonial merchants in Carolina, Chickasaw raiders began to attack settlements belonging to a rival tribe, the Choctaw, in order to acquire captives which they sold to the colonists. These raids largely subsided after the Choctaw acquired firearms of their own from the French.

Allied with British colonists in the Southern Colonies, the Chickasaw were often at war with the French and the Choctaw in the 18th century, such as in the Battle of Ackia on May 26, 1736. Skirmishes continued until France ceded its claims to the region east of the Mississippi River after being defeated by the British in the Seven Years' War (called the French and Indian War in North America).

Following the American Revolutionary War, in 1793–94, the Chickasaw under Chief Piomingo fought as allies of the new United States under General Anthony Wayne against the Indians of the old Northwest Territory. The Shawnee and other, allied Northwest Indians were defeated in the Battle of Fallen Timbers on August 20, 1794.

A 19th-century historian, Horatio Cushman, wrote, "Neither the Choctaws nor Chicksaws ever engaged in war against the American people, but always stood as their faithful allies." Cushman believed the Chickasaw, along with the Choctaw, may have had origins in present-day Mexico and migrated north. That theory does not have consensus; archeological research, as noted above, has revealed the peoples had long histories in the Mississippi area and independently developed complex cultures.

Tribal lands

In 1797, a general appraisal of the tribe and its territorial bounds was made by Abraham Bishop of New Haven, who wrote:

United States relations
 
George Washington (first U.S. President) and Henry Knox (first U.S. Secretary of War) proposed the cultural transformation of Native Americans. Washington believed that Native Americans were equals, but that their society was inferior. He formulated a policy to encourage the "civilizing" process, and Thomas Jefferson continued it. Historian Robert Remini wrote, "They presumed that once the Indians adopted the practice of private property, built homes, farmed, educated their children, and embraced Christianity, these Native Americans would win acceptance from white Americans." Washington's six-point plan included impartial justice toward Indians; regulated buying of Indian lands; promotion of commerce; promotion of experiments to civilize or improve Indian society; presidential authority to give presents; and punishing those who violated Indian rights.
The government-appointed Indian agents, such as Benjamin Hawkins, who became Superintendent of Indian Affairs for all the territory south of the Ohio River. He and other agents lived among the Indians to teach them, through example and instruction, how to live like whites. Hawkins married a Muscogee Creek woman and lived with her people for decades. In the 19th century, the Chickasaw increasingly adopted European-American practices, as they established schools, adopted yeoman farming practices, converted to Christianity, and built homes in styles like their European-American neighbors.

Due to settlers encroaching into Chickasaw territory, the United States constructed Fort Hampton in 1810 in present-day Limestone County, Alabama. The fort was designed to keep settlers out of Chickasaw territory and was one of the few forts constructed in the United States to protect Native American land claims.

Treaty of Hopewell (1786)

The Chickasaw signed the Treaty of Hopewell in 1786. Article 11 of that treaty states: "The hatchet shall be forever buried, and the peace given by the United States of America, and friendship re-established between the said States on the one part, and the Chickasaw nation on the other part, shall be universal, and the contracting parties shall use their utmost endeavors to maintain the peace given as aforesaid, and friendship re-established."  Benjamin Hawkins attended this signing.

Treaty of 1818
In 1818, leaders of the Chickasaw signed several treaties, including the Treaty of Tuscaloosa, which ceded all claims to land north of the southern border of Tennessee up to the Ohio River (the southern border of Indiana and the Illinois Territory). This was known as the "Jackson Purchase."  The Chickasaw were allowed to retain a four-square-mile reservation but were required to lease the land to European immigrants.

Colbert legacy (19th century)
In the mid-18th century, an American-born trader of Scots and Chickasaw ancestry by the name of James Logan Colbert settled in the Muscle Shoals area of Mississippi.  He lived there for the next 40 years, where he married three high-ranking Chickasaw women in succession. Chickasaw chiefs and high-status women found such marriages of strategic benefit to the tribe, as it gave them advantages with traders over other groups. Colbert and his wives had numerous children, including seven sons: William, Jonathan, George, Levi, Samuel, Joseph, and Pittman (or James). Six survived to adulthood (Jonathan died young.)

The Chickasaw had a matrilineal system, in which children were considered born into the mother's clan; and they gained their status in the tribe from her family. Property and hereditary leadership passed through the maternal line, and the mother's eldest brother was the main male mentor of the children, especially of boys. Because of the status of their mothers, for nearly a century, the Colbert-Chickasaw sons and their descendants provided critical leadership during the tribe's greatest challenges. They had the advantage of growing up bilingual.

Of these six sons, William "Chooshemataha" Colbert (named after James Logan's father, Chief/Major William d'Blainville "Piomingo" Colbert) served with General Andrew Jackson during the Creek Wars of 1813–14. He also had served during the Revolutionary wars and received a commission from President George Washington in 1786 along with his namesake grandfather.  His brothers Levi ("Itawamba Mingo") and George Colbert ("Tootesmastube") also had military service in support of the United States. In addition, the two each served as interpreters and negotiators for chiefs of the tribe during the period of removal. Levi Colbert served as principal chief, which may have been a designation by the Americans, who did not understand the decentralized nature of the chiefs' council, based on the tribe reaching broad consensus for major decisions. An example is that more than 40 chiefs from the Chickasaw Council, representing clans and villages, signed a letter in November 1832 by Levi Colbert to President Andrew Jackson, complaining about treaty negotiations with his appointee General John Coffee. After Levi's death in 1834, the Chickasaw people were forced upon the Trail of Tears. His brother, George Colbert, reluctantly succeeded him as chief and principal negotiator, because he was bilingual and bicultural. George "Tootesmastube" Colbert never reached the Chickasaw's "Oka Homa" (red waters); he died on Choctaw territory, Fort Towson, en route.

Treaty of Pontotoc Creek and Removal (1832-1837)
In 1832 after the state of Mississippi declared its jurisdiction over the Chickasaw Indians, outlawing tribal self-governance, Chickasaw chiefs assembled at the national council house on October 20, 1832 and signed the Treaty of Pontotoc Creek, ceding their remaining Mississippi territory to the U.S. and agreeing to find land and relocate west of the Mississippi River. Between 1832 and 1837, the Chickasaw would make further negotiations and arrangements for their removal. 

Unlike other tribes who received land grants in exchange for ceding territory, the Chickasaw held out for financial compensation: they were to receive $3 million U.S. dollars from the United States for their lands east of the Mississippi River.
In 1836 after a bitter five-year debate within the tribe, the Chickasaw had reached an agreement to purchase land in Indian Territory from the previously removed Choctaw. They paid the Choctaw $530,000 for the westernmost part of their land. The first group of Chickasaw moved in 1837. For nearly 30 years, the US did not pay the Chickasaw the $3 million it owed them for their historic territory in the Southeast.

The Chickasaw gathered at Memphis, Tennessee, on July 4, 1837, with all of their portable assets: belongings, livestock, and enslaved African Americans. Three thousand and one Chickasaw crossed the Mississippi River, following routes established by the Choctaw and Creek.  During the journey, often called the Trail of Tears by all the Southeast tribes that had to make it, more than 500 Chickasaw died of dysentery and smallpox.

When the Chickasaw reached Indian Territory, the United States began to administer to them through the Choctaw Nation, and later merged them for administrative reasons. The Chickasaw wrote their own constitution in the 1850s, an effort contributed to by Holmes Colbert.

After several decades of mistrust between the two peoples, in the twentieth century, the Chickasaw re-established their independent government. They are federally recognized as the Chickasaw Nation. The government is headquartered in Ada, Oklahoma.

American Civil War (1861)
The Chickasaw Nation was the first of the Five Civilized Tribes to become allies of the Confederate States of America. In addition, they resented the United States government, which had forced them off their lands and failed to protect them against the Plains tribes in the West. In 1861, as tensions rose related to the sectional conflict, the US Army abandoned Fort Washita, leaving the Chickasaw Nation defenseless against the Plains tribes. Confederate officials recruited the American Indian tribes with suggestions of an Indian state if they were victorious in the Civil War.

The Chickasaw passed a resolution allying with the Confederacy, which was signed by Governor Cyrus Harris on May 25, 1861.

At the beginning of the American Civil War, Albert Pike was appointed as Confederate envoy to Native Americans. In this capacity, he negotiated several treaties, including the Treaty with Choctaws and Chickasaws in July 1861. The treaty covered sixty-four terms, covering many subjects such as Choctaw and Chickasaw nation sovereignty, Confederate States of America citizenship possibilities and an entitled delegate in the House of Representatives of the Confederate States of America. Because the Chickasaw sided with the Confederate States of America during the American Civil War, they had to forfeit some of their land afterward. In addition, the US renegotiated their treaty, insisting on their emancipation of slaves and offering citizenship to those who wanted to stay in the Chickasaw Nation. If they returned to the United States, they would have US citizenship.

Government

The Chickasaws were first combined with the Choctaw Nation and their area was called the Chickasaw District. Although originally the western boundary of the Choctaw Nation extended to the 100th meridian, virtually no Chickasaw lived west of the Cross Timbers. The area was subject to continual raiding by the Indians on the Southern Plains. The United States eventually leased the area between the 100th and 98th meridians for the use of the Plains tribes. The area was referred to as the "Leased District".

Treaties

Post–Civil War

Because the Chickasaw allied with the Confederacy, after the Civil War the United States government required the nation to make a new peace treaty in 1866. It included the provision that they emancipate the enslaved African Americans and provide full citizenship to those who wanted to stay in the Chickasaw Nation.

These people and their descendants became known as the Chickasaw Freedmen. Descendants of the Freedmen continue to live in Oklahoma. Today, the Choctaw-Chickasaw Freedmen Association of Oklahoma represents the interests of freedmen descendants in both of these tribes.

But the Chickasaw Nation never granted citizenship to the Chickasaw freedmen. The only way that African Americans could become citizens at that time was to have one or more Chickasaw parents or to petition for citizenship and go through the process available to other non-Natives, even if they were of known partial Chickasaw descent in an earlier generation. Because the Chickasaw Nation did not provide citizenship to their freedmen after the Civil War (it would have been akin to formal adoption of individuals into the tribe), they were penalized by the U.S. Government. It took more than half of their territory, with no compensation. They lost territory that had been negotiated in treaties in exchange for their use after removal from the Southeast.

State-recognized groups

The Chaloklowa Chickasaw Indian People, made up of descendants of Chickasaw who did not leave the Southeast, were recognized as a "state-recognized group" in 2005 by South Carolina. They are headquartered in Hemingway, South Carolina. In 2003, they unsuccessfully petitioned the US Department of the Interior Bureau of Indian Affairs to try to gain federal recognition as an Indian tribe.

 Culture 
The suffix -mingo (Chickasaw: minko) is used to identify a chief. For example, Tishomingo was the name of a famous Chickasaw chief. The towns of Tishomingo in Mississippi and Oklahoma were named for him, as was Tishomingo County in Mississippi. South Carolina's Black Mingo Creek was named after a colonial Chickasaw chief, who controlled the lands around it as a hunting ground. Sometimes the suffix is spelled minco, but this most often occurs in older literary references.

In 2010, the tribe opened the Chickasaw Cultural Center in Sulphur, Oklahoma. It includes the Chikasha Inchokka’ Traditional Village, Honor Garden, Sky and Water pavilion, and several in-depth exhibits about the diverse culture of the Chickasaw.

Notable Chickasaw

 Bill Anoatubby, Governor of the Chickasaw Nation since 1987
 Jack Brisco and Jerry Brisco, pro wrestling tag team
 Jodi Byrd, Literary and political theorist
 Edwin Carewe (1883–1940), movie actor and director
 Charles David Carter, Democratic U. S. Congressman from Oklahoma
 Levi Colbert, Chickasaw language translator
 Tom Cole, Republican U.S. Congressman from Oklahoma
 Don Cheadle, Chickasaw Freedmen actor
 Molly Culver, actress
 Kent DuChaine, American Blues singer and guitarist
 Hiawatha Estes, architect
 Bee Ho Gray, actor
 John Herrington, astronaut; first Native American in space
 Linda Hogan, Writer-in-Residence of the Chickasaw Nation
 Miko Hughes, actor
 Julia Jones, actress
 Kyle Keller, Head Men's Basketball Coach, Stephen F. Austin Lumberjacks 
 Neal A. McCaleb, Assistant U.S. Secretary for Indian Affairs (overseeing the BIA) under George W. Bush
 Wahoo McDaniel, pro wrestler, American Football League player
 Leona Mitchell, opera singer
 Rodd Redwing, actor
 Rebecca Sandefur, Sociologist and MacArthur Fellow 
 Jerod Impichchaachaaha' Tate, composer and pianist
 Te Ata, traditional Indian storyteller and actress
 Tishomingo_(Chickasaw_leader), properly Tishu Miko(chief officer or guard of the king), sub-chief prior to removal
 Fred Waite, cowboy and Chickasaw Nation statesman
 Kevin K. Washburn, Assistant U.S. Secretary for Indian Affairs under Barack Obama
 Montford Johnson, famous cattle rancher. In April 2020, Montford was inducted into the Hall of Great Westerners of the National Cowboy & Western Heritage Museum.[35]

See also

 Chickasaw Nation
 Chickasaw language
 List of sites and peoples visited by the Hernando de Soto Expedition
 Chickasaw Wars
 Pashofa
 Perry Cohea

Footnotes

Further reading

 James F. Barnett, Jr., Mississippi's American Indians. Jackson, MS: University Press of Mississippi, 2012.
 Colin G. Calloway,  The American Revolution in Indian Country. Cambridge University Press, 1995.
 Daniel F. Littlefield, Jr., The Chickasaw Freedmen: A People Without a Country.'' Westport, CT: Greenwood Press, 1980.

External links

 The Chickasaw Nation of Oklahoma, official site
 Chickasaw.tv The online video network of the Chickasaw Nation.
 Chickasaw Nation Industries (government contracting arm of the Chickasaw Nation)
 "Chickasaws: The Unconquerable People", a brief history by Greg O'Brien, Ph.D.
 Tishomingo
 Pashofa recipe
 Tanshpashofa recipe
 Encyclopedia of Oklahoma History and Culture - Chickasaw

 
Native American tribes in Alabama
Native American tribes in Mississippi
Native American tribes in Oklahoma
South Appalachian Mississippian culture
Native Americans in the American Revolution